The Hospitality Association of Namibia (HAN) is a trade association for the hospitality sector in Namibia. It is fully funded by its members and serves as a self-regulating governing body for all aspects of the hospitality industry. It provides members with guidelines for service and access to training.

Composition 
An executive committee of its members, elected by its members, governs HAN.

History 
The Hospitality Association of Namibia was established in 1987 with just 16 members, and membership has since grown to include over 400 members.

Controversy 
The Hospitality Association of Namibia has been in the news recently for discrimination and favoritism in the Namibian Tourism Industry. Since they only represent 8% of the registered entities and account for only 1% of the national statistics on occupancy rates, there have been concerns raised by some as to their role in the tourism industry.

Membership 
Members of HAN include representatives of every area of hospitality, including hotels, guest houses, guest farms, lodges, rest camps, restaurants, conference centers and catering services.

Office 
The Hospitality Association of Namibia (HAN) head office is located in Namibia's capital city, Windhoek.

References 

Hospitality industry organizations
Self-regulatory organizations
Regulation in Namibia